Pass of Balmaha may refer to:

 The narrow pass at the village of Balmaha, Scotland
 Several ships with that name